Víctor Alejandro Dávila Zavala (born 4 November 1997), known as Víctor Dávila, is a Chilean professional footballer who plays for Liga MX club León.

International career
Along with Chile U20, he won the L'Alcúdia Tournament in 2015.

Career statistics

Honours
Necaxa
 Copa MX: Clausura 2018
 Supercopa MX: 2018

León
 Leagues Cup: 2021

Chile U20
 L'Alcúdia International Tournament (1): 2015

References

External links
 

1997 births
Living people
People from Iquique
Chilean footballers
Chile under-20 international footballers
Chile international footballers
Chilean expatriate footballers
C.D. Huachipato footballers
Club Necaxa footballers
C.F. Pachuca players
Club León footballers
Chilean Primera División players
Liga MX players
Chilean expatriate sportspeople in Mexico
Expatriate footballers in Mexico
Association football midfielders